Zboiska – village in Bukowsko borough by the Sanoczek creek, on a Bokowskie foothills, Sanok county, podkarpackie voivodship.  It borders with Ratnawica village from south.

History 
Historic names of village: Boyscza 1361, Boyska 1398, Boyschcze 1402, Bogiska 1437, Szboyska 1539, Zboiska alias Uhrynowce 1676.

From 1340 to 1772 it belonged to Sanok Land, Ruthenian Voivodship. From 1772 to 1852 cyrkuł leski (administration unit similar to county), then cyrkuł sanocki. From 1867 Sanok county, borough Bukowsko in Galicia. 

Probably village was founded by prince Jerzy II, as a service village to Sanok castle-town. In 1361 empty area placed on fields common known as Boyscza, own by church under the invocation of St. Paul in Bukowsko, borough by the Sanoczek creek, borders with kings village Prusiek and from Pobiedno village till source of the creek Sanoczek (source: Kod. Dypl. Małopolski III, page 741, 1361). Zboiska in 1361 thanks to conferment of king Kazimierz Wielki became an ownership of knights from Hungary, brothers Piotr and Paweł (Peter and Paul) Bal. Royal prerogative name under the same date villages: Wisłok, Radoszyce, Jurowce, Srogów, Dydnia, Temeszów and others. From 1434 Piotr from Zboiska, Petrus de Boyska, Petrus de Tyrawa, married with Małgorzata (Margaret), 1434-1465 Sanok bannerman, was the owner of Zboiska, Wolica, Bełchówka, Zachoczewie and Bukowsko. 

In 1485 as a result of incursion of chatelain Stanisław Kmita on a Zboiska village, which was the possession of Lwów chamberlain and Biecki starost Piotr Herburt Felsztyński, there was burned dow house and tower placed there (latin: domus et turris). 

Succeeding owners were Leszczyńscy, in the 19th century owned by Kokowscy and Jodłowscy. In the middle of the 19th century noble property owned by Józef Gołaszewski. In 1905 Zofia Jodłowska owned almost 167,7 ha of village and in 1911 owned only 8 ha. 

In 1529 thanks to Mikołaj Herburt Odnowski, Kraków voivode there was erected in Zboiska new minor defence castle (Zborsko). Village with fortalice is mentioned also in 1553. In 1657 army of Rakoczy crossed village destroying castle. Mentioned manor house was placed between, held to present times, elevated earth mound, surrounded by deep dry moat which dominate almost 15 m over Sileski creek below. Foundation altogether have dimensions about 80x80 m, radius of mound is about 30 m. Until present day on the grounds of manor park preserve ruins of building and ground entrenchments. In half of the 19th century Kokowski family build in Zboiska manor house complex. 

In year 1946/47 in the village and in neighborhood take places heavy fights between local community and UPA.

Residents 
Names of the families in 19th century: Bończak, Barna, Beck, Bogacz, Januk, Kozak, Klepczyk, Knieja, Kos, Krok, Macek, Lilienthal, Maciejowski, Mazur, Marosz, Modrzanski, Patała, Olejarczyk, Pendzior, Peszyński, Rakoczy, Starzecki, Petejko, Pielech, Szczurek, Tarnawczyk, Wdowiak, Dymiński, Klocek, Piotrowski.

Religion 
Roman Catholic parish in Bukowsko village. Greek Catholic parish under the invocation of św. Apostołów Piotra i Pawła (st. Apostoles Peter and Paul) was in Wolica, old local church was burned during war. Currently in village is newly constructed Roman Catholic church, which belong to Prusiek parish under the invocation of NMP Królowej Polski (Blessed Virgin Mary Queen of Poland), Sanoks decanate.

Monuments 

 Manor house constructed by Kokowski family in the first half of 19th century 

 Burgstall of defensive tower from 15th or 16th century with kept moat and bank.

Turism 
In Zboiska village is operating few agroturistic pensions and stud.

Fun facts 
Uherce, Uhryń and former Uhrynowce today Zboiska, is the name of village which have Hungarian etymology and their connection to historic Hungarian region but also flowing through it river Ung. In Slovak and Czech language Uhorsko. Mentioned by professor Przemysław Dąbkowski “Hungarian populace in Sanoks lands (at the beginning of the 14th century) was there permanently or temporary. It is very probable that similarly to other lands, here in Sanoks lands, was placed some settlements, populated by Hungarians which with time had been polonized.

Twin cities
Topoľovka
Maizières-lès-Metz, France

Literature
 Adam Fastnacht, Nagórzany [in:] Slownik Historyczno-Geograficzny Ziemi Sanockiej w Średniowieczu (Historic-Geographic Dictionary of the Sanok District in the Middle Ages), Kraków, (II edition 2002), .
Jerzy Zuba "W Gminie Bukowsko". Roksana, 2004, . Translated by Deborah Greenlee. Arlington, TX 76016.

External links
 Geographical Dictionary of the Kingdom of Poland and other Slavic Lands Słownik geograficzny Królestwa Polskiego i innych krajów słowiańskich. tom. XV, pages 561-562. Warszawa. 1876. (digital edition)
 Caritas in Zboiskach
 Castle Zboiska

Villages in Sanok County
Populated places established in the 1360s
1361 establishments in Europe
14th-century establishments in Poland